Annah Faulkner (1949/1950 – 8 March 2022) was an Australian novelist. 

At the age of five, Faulkner moved with her parents to Papua New Guinea and later lived on Queensland's Sunshine Coast with her husband. She died in March 2022, after leaving a note arguing for more humane death laws permitting access to suicide for older Australians.

Bibliography

Novels
 The Beloved (2011)
 Last Day in the Dynamite Factory (2015)

Awards 
 2011 winner Queensland Premier's Literary Awards for Best Manuscript of an Emerging Queensland Author
 2013 shortlisted Miles Franklin Literary Award for The Beloved
 2013 winner Nita Kibble Literary Award for The Beloved

Interviews
 Karen Hardy in The Sydney Morning Herald, 27 June 2015, on the publication of the author's second novel
 John Purcell on Booktopia, "Annah Faulkner, author of The Beloved, answers Ten Terrifying Questions"

References

External links
 

20th-century births
2022 deaths
21st-century Australian novelists
Australian women novelists
21st-century Australian women writers
Year of birth missing